William, Bill or Billy Woods may refer to:

Politicians
William Woods (congressman) (1790–1837), American lawyer from New York, served 1823–1825
William Burnham Woods (1824–1887), American jurist and Civil War general from Ohio
William Cleaver Woods (1852–1943), Australian pioneering physician
William Carlton Woods (1891–1965), Canadian farmer from Saskatchewan
William Woods (Irish politician) (before 1935—1966), independent member of Seanad Éireann

Sportsmen
Bill Woods (Australian footballer) (1890–1972), player with Geelong in VFL
Willie Woods (1898–1927), American baseball outfielder in 1920s Negro leagues
Billy Woods (New Zealand footballer), international level player in 1947
Billy Woods (1926–1980), English footballer who played in 1949–50 Rochdale A.F.C. season
Billy Woods (Irish footballer) (born 1973), winger, later coach with Cork City
William Woods (baseball) (born 1998), American pitcher for Mets

Others
William Woods (officer of arms) (1785–1842), British Clarenceux King of Arms in 1831, promoted to Garter in 1838
William Allen Woods (1837–1901), American federal judge
William Maitland Woods (1864–1927), English Anglican minister and military chaplain in Australia
William Aaron Woods (born 1942), American researcher in natural language processing and semantics
William E. Woods (1949–2008), American gay rights activist in Hawaii
Bill Woods (born 1962), Australian television broadcaster
Billy Woods, American hip-hop artist, active since 1990s

See also
William Woods Holden (1818–1892), governor of North Carolina, 1865 and 1868–1871
William Woods University, American university in Fulton, Missouri, established 1870
William Wood (disambiguation)